Jai Veer Hanuman was an Indian TV serial, that aired on Sony Entertainment Television in 1995. It was among the first TV serials to be telecast on Sony. It was produced by Padmalya Telefilms Limited. It starred Arun Govil as Ram and Vindu Singh as Hanuman.

Premise 
The story depicts the journey of Lord Hanuman from his birth to helping Luv and Kush.

Cast 
Arun Govil as Ram
Vindu Singh as Hanuman
Udaya Bhanu as Sita
 Bhavani Shankar as Lakshman
Dara Singh as Kesari
Goga Kapoor as Ravana

References 

Sony Entertainment Television original programming
Television shows based on poems
1995 Indian television series debuts
1996 Indian television series endings
1990s Indian television series
Television series based on the Ramayana